Bloody Tears may refer to:

Haemolacria, the medical condition where tears contain blood
Bloody Tears, a theme music in the Castlevania video game series
"Bloody Tears", a song by Army of the Pharaohs from the 2007 album Ritual of Battle